Keystone Hotel is a historic home located at Hummelstown, Dauphin County, Pennsylvania.  The original building was built in 1839, and was more than doubled in 1850.  It was originally a 2 1/2-story, rectangular brick building with gable roof in a vernacular Federal style.  The 1850 expansion raised and flattened the original roofline, and added a three-bay, three-story brick addition to the east side.  An old brownstone addition pre-dates the 1839 building.

It was added to the National Register of Historic Places in 1985.

References

Hotel buildings on the National Register of Historic Places in Pennsylvania
Federal architecture in Pennsylvania
Hotel buildings completed in 1839
Hotel buildings completed in 1850
Buildings and structures in Dauphin County, Pennsylvania
National Register of Historic Places in Dauphin County, Pennsylvania